Loki Patera  is the largest volcanic depression on Jupiter's moon Io,  in diameter. It contains an active lava lake, with an episodically overturning crust. The level of activity seen is similar to a superfast spreading mid-ocean ridge on Earth. Temperature measurements of thermal emission at Loki Patera taken by Voyager 1's Infrared Interferometer Spectrometer and Radiometer (IRIS) instrument were consistent with sulfur volcanism.

Io's lava lakes such as Loki Patera are depressions partially filled with molten lava covered by a thin solidified crust. These lava lakes are directly connected to a magma reservoir below. Observations of thermal emission at several of Io's lava lakes reveal glowing molten rock along Loki Patera's margin, caused by the lake's crust breaking up along the edge of the patera. Over time, because the solidified lava is denser than the still-molten magma below, this crust can founder, exposing fresh, hot molten rock. At sites such as Loki Patera, this can occur episodically. During an overturning episode, Loki can emit up to ten times more heat than when its crust is stable. Another eruption would begin once the new crust has cooled and thickened enough for it to no longer be buoyant over the molten lava.

On March 8, 2015 a rare orbital alignment occurred between Io and Europa, two of the moons of Jupiter, that allowed researchers to distinguish heat being emitted from Loki Patera. They were able to accomplish this because Europa's surface is coated in water ice which reflects small amounts of sunlight at infrared wavelengths. Scientists were able to determine that there were two waves of resurfacing lava, which explains the change in brightness on Loki Patera every 400–600 days. The images that helped researchers discover this were captured by the Large Binocular Telescope Observatory in southeast Arizona. The observation also revealed that there is a difference in the magma supply of the two halves of Loki.

It is named after the Norse god Loki. Amaterasu Patera is located to the north and Manua Patera to the northwest.

See also

Volcanism on Io
List of volcanic features on Io

References

External links
Loki Patera/NIMS at CICLOPS
"NIMS Observes Increased Activity at Loki Patera, Io", JPL Planetary Photojournal
"An Impact Genesis for Loki Patera?" Lunar and Planetary Science XXXVI (2005)

Volcanoes of Io (moon)
Active volcanoes
Lava lakes